The Quartz Mountain mine is one of the largest gold mines in Canada and in the world. The mine is located in the north of the country in Northwest Territories. The mine has estimated reserves of 2.74 million oz of gold.

References 

Gold mines in the Northwest Territories